The Chief of Personnel (COP) in the Indian Navy is a senior appointment in the rank of Vice-Admiral. As a Principal Staff Officer (PSO) at Naval Headquarters (NHQ), the COP is responsible for personnel-related matters. The present COP is Vice-Admiral Dinesh K Tripathi, who was appointed on 1 June 2021.

History
At the time of Independence of India, the COP was one of five PSOs at Naval headquarters. The appointment was held by an officer of the rank of Captain. On 24 September 1956, the appointment was upgraded to the rank of Commodore (Second Class). The directorates of personnel services, training education, medical services, judge advocate general and the supply branch were under the COP.

In 1965, the appointment was further upgraded to Rear Admiral. Rear Admiral K. R. Nair was the first COP in this rank, when he took over on 17 August 1965. The post was further upgraded to Vice Admiral in March 1973. During this re-organisation, an assistant PSO post was created - Assistant Chief of Personnel (ACOP) - a two-star appointment. In the 1980s, two new directorates were formed under the COP - Financial Planning (Non-public funds) in 1985 and Ex-Servicemen Affairs (DESA) in 1988.

Organisation
The COP heads the Personnel Branch at the Naval Headquarters. The following Directors General/Controllers/Assistant Principal Staff Officers report into the COP.

 Controller of Personnel Services
 Director General Medical Services
 Assistant Director General Medical Services
 Assistant Chief of Personnel (HRD)
 Assistant Chief of Personnel (Administration and Civilian)
 Judge Advocate General

Appointees

Notes

References

Bibliography

Indian military appointments
Indian Navy appointments